Claygate Cross is a hamlet in the Tonbridge and Malling district, in the English county of Kent.

Location 
It is near the River Bourne. Nearby settlements include the large town of Sevenoaks, the villages of Borough Green and Ightham, and the hamlets of Claygate, Basted, Sheet Hill and Crouch.

Transport 
It is about one and a half miles away from the A227 road.

References 

Hamlets in Kent
Tonbridge and Malling